Thalikkottai Rajuthevar Baalu, better known as T. R. Baalu (called as Baalu), is an Indian politician. Baalu did his B.Sc. from New College, Chennai in Madras University and diploma in drafting engineering drawings from Central polytechnic Chennai. He is currently the MP of Lok Sabha  of the Sriperumbudur constituency, elected five times since 1996 from Chennai South and Sriperumbudur. He is a leader of the DMK party and is known for political loyalty having been in the party since 1957. He is now the Treasurer of DMK, elected unopposed on 3 September 2020. He earlier served as the Principal Secretary of the DMK Party from August 2018 to January 2020.

Career and personal life 
Thalikottai Raju Baalu is an leader of the DMK (Dravida Munnetra Kazhagam) Party. Baalu was born on 15 June 1941 to Rajuthevar and Vadivambal at Thalikottai in Thiruvarur District of Tamil Nadu. He belongs to Agamudayar. He obtained his Diploma in Engineering from Central Polytechnic in Chennai and graduated from New College, Chennai. Baalu's political career started at a very early age of sixteen when he joined the DMK party. He became Secretary of Chennai City District (Unsplit) unit of DMK in 1982.

Baalu was first elected to Parliament as a member of Rajya Sabha in 1986.

Lok Sabha in 1996 from Chennai South constituency and became Minister of State in the Ministry Petroleum and Natural Gas. Towards the end of his tenure, he also held additional charge of the then Ministry of Non-conventional Energy Sources (now called the Ministry of New and Renewable Energy). Baalu was re-elected to Lok Sabha in 1998, 1999 and 2004 from the same constituency and again in 2009 and 2019 from Sriperumbudur constituency. Baalu served as Cabinet Minister of Environment and Forests from 1999 to December 2003 and as Minister of Shipping and Road Transport and Highways from 2004 to 2009.

T.R. Baalu was the Leader of DMK Parliamentary Party during the 15th Loksabha and 17th Lok Sabha and He also held the charge as Chairman of the Department Related Standing Committee of Parliament of the Ministry of Railways. In addition, Baalu was a member of several parliamentary committees like Ethics Committee, House Committee and Consultative Committee of Ministry of Finance. He is also a Member of International World Affairs Council (IWAC).

In his political career Baalu went to jail over 20 times for participating in demonstrations and agitations for public cause. He came to political limelight when he was jailed for one year under MISA in 1976 for protesting against Emergency clamped in the country. He protested strongly against the midnight arrest and imprisonment of his party leader Karunanidhi on 30 June 2001. At that time, he was the union Minister of Environment, Forest and Climate Change. And it was the first time, a Cabinet Minister to be arrested by a State's Police Force.

Baalu is married to Renuka Devi and Porkodi and he has three sons and two daughters. His first son, R.B. Raj Kumar, is the Chairman of Kings India Chemicals. His second son, Dr. T R B Rajaa is the incumbent MLA from Mannargudi Constituency elected from the 2011, 2016 and 2021 Tamil Nadu Legislative Assembly elections and the Secretary of the party's IT Wing. His third son, Selvakumar Baalu is the CEO of Twice group.

Elections contested and positions held

   1986–1992 : was elected as a Member, Rajya Sabha
   1996: Elected to Lok Sabha (Eleventh) for the 1st time
   1996-1998: Minister of State, Petroleum, Natural Gas and Non-Conventional Energy Sources
   1998: Elected to Lok Sabha (Twelfth) for the second time
   1999: Elected to Lok Sabha (Thirteenth) for the third time
   1999-2003: Cabinet Minister, Environment and Forests
   2004: Elected to Lok Sabha (Fourteenth) for the fourth time from Chennai South (Lok Sabha constituency)
   2004-2009: Cabinet minister for Shipping, Road Transport & Highways.
   2009: Elected to Lok Sabha (Fifteenth) for the fifth time from Sriperumbudur
   2019: Elected to Lok Sabha (Seventeenth) for the sixth time from Sriperumbudur

As a member of parliament and minister

Baalu is one of the prominent leaders to work towards the implementation of Sethusamudram Shipping Canal Project. He was handling it during his tenure as the minister of Shipping, Road Transport and Highways. The project proposes linking the Palk Bay and the Gulf of Mannar between India and Sri Lanka by creating a shipping canal through the shallow sea sometimes called Setu Samudram, and through the chain of islands variously known as Ram Sethu or the Adam's Bridge. A few organisations are opposing the dredging of Ramasethu on religious, environmental and economical grounds. Many of these parties and organisations support implementation of this project using one of the five alternative alignments considered earlier without damaging the structure considered sacred by Hindus. During 2006, the Supreme Court Baalu quashed a case requesting a ban on the project and issues notices to Baalu and the environment ministry. With 22 km of dredging remaining, the project is held from March 2010 by a Supreme Court order seeking the Central Government to clarify the status of the bridge as a national monument. He was recruited as a minister in 2009 during the second term on UPA coalition government as it was reported that the Prime Minister was unhappy with Baalu over the corruption charges in Sethusamudram project. But he continued as the head of the DMK parliamentary party and also part of various central committees.

DMK pulled out of the ruling UPA on 20 March 2013 following widespread protests in Tamil Nadu against the central government for not taking up the concerns of Tamils in Sri Lanka in the UN resolution against the alleged human rights violation against Tamils by Sri Lankan government. There was a brief controversy when Azhagiri did not accompany the contingency led by Baalu, the head of MPs from the DMK party, to tender resignation in the Prime minister's office and to hand over the letter of withdrawal to the President on 20 March 2013. It was claimed as a mark of protest against his father Karunanidhi's decision to pull out from the central ministry. Some sources claim he delayed his resignation as he was not kept in the loop while taking the decision and snubbed Baalu.

The fifth Joint parliamentary committee was constituted in February 2011 to probe 2G case. It is headed by P.C. Chacko and had 30 members, 15 each from the ruling UPA and opposition members belonging to BJP, JD (U), CPI, CPM, Trinamool Congress, BJD, DMK and the AIADMK in the 30-member panel accused P.C. Chacko of being "partisan" and demanded his removal (They submitted a memorandum to the Lok Sabha Speaker expressing their "no-confidence".) Three of the DMK MPs, namely, A. Raja, the IT and Telecommunication minister, Kanimozhi, the daughter of Karunanidhi and Rajya Sabha MP and Dayanidhi Maran, the nephew and IT and Telecommunication minister preceding A. Raja, are the three accused in the scam. Baalu is the only member from the DMK in the committee and he, along with other opposition members, snubbed the report as "half boiled" as the draft report gave a clean chit to Prime Minister Manmohan Singh and Finance Minister P Chidambaram, while implicating the DMK minister A. Raja.

References

External links
 Official biographical sketch in Parliament of India website

 

Living people
Dravida Munnetra Kazhagam politicians
Lok Sabha members from Tamil Nadu
1941 births
India MPs 2004–2009
India MPs 2009–2014
India MPs 2019–present
Indian amateur radio operators
Union Ministers from Tamil Nadu
India MPs 1996–1997
India MPs 1998–1999
India MPs 1999–2004
Candidates in the 2014 Indian general election
Indians imprisoned during the Emergency (India)
2G spectrum case
Corruption in Tamil Nadu
People from Tiruvarur district
Politicians from Chennai
Members of the Cabinet of India